Crassispira melonesiana is a species of sea snail, a marine gastropod mollusk in the family Pseudomelatomidae.

Description
The length of the shell attains 10 mm, its diameter 4 mm.

(Original description) the small, solid, strong shell is spindle-shaped, with one or two smooth nepionic and eight strongly sculptured subsequent whorls. The holotype is of an ashy brown (possibly in some cases nearly or quite black) with the sculptural prominences white. The notch is short, subcircular, leaving a narrow, strongly excavated fasciole separated from the suture behind it by a line of half-moon-shaped nodules, though the fasciole is so narrow and deep that at first sight it would be taken for the suture. The sculpture is essentially as figured, with fine interstitial spirals reticulated by the incremental lines. The aperture is narrow, not lirate. The columella and the throat are brownish.

Distribution
This marine species occurs off Puerto Rico

References

melonesia
Taxa named by William Healey Dall
Taxa named by Charles Torrey Simpson
Gastropods described in 1901